Wilfred Lievesley (6 October 1902 – 21 February 1979) was an English footballer. His regular position was as a forward. He was born in Netherthorpe, Derbyshire. He played for Derby County, Manchester United, Exeter City, Wigan Borough and Cardiff City.

His cousin Leslie Lievesley was also a footballer; he was later first-team coach of Torino and was killed in the Superga air disaster in 1949.

References

External links
Profile at MUFCInfo.com

1902 births
1979 deaths
English footballers
Association football forwards
Derby County F.C. players
Manchester United F.C. players
Exeter City F.C. players
Wigan Borough F.C. players
Cardiff City F.C. players
Macclesfield Town F.C. players
English Football League players